Onykia appelloefi may be a species of squid in the family Onychoteuthidae. The species occurs in the Atlantic Ocean. It is a taxon inquirendum and it requires more research to confirm its validity as a species.

External links
 SeaLifeBase:Onykia appelloefi

Squid
Molluscs described in 1900